Eugène Coulon (2 June 1899 – 8 February 1969) was a French long jumper. He competed at the 1920 Summer Olympics and finished 11th.

References

External links
 

1899 births
1969 deaths
French male long jumpers
Athletes (track and field) at the 1920 Summer Olympics
Olympic athletes of France